The Boxing Kangaroo is an 1896 British short black-and-white silent documentary film, produced and directed by Birt Acres for exhibition on Robert W. Paul's peep show Kinetoscopes, featuring a young boy boxing with a kangaroo. The film was considered lost until footage from an 1896 Fairground Programme, originally shown in a portable booth at Hull Fair by Midlands photographer George Williams, donated to the National Fairground Archive was identified as being from this film.

It was one of at least four boxing-themed films Acres produced in 1896, the others being Boxing Match; or, Glove Contest, A Boxing Match in Two Rounds by Sgt. Instructor F.Barrett and Sgt. Pope and A Prize Fight by Jem Mace and Burke. The year before, German filmmaker Max Skladanowsky had made a similar film depicting a man boxing with a kangaroo, entitled Das boxende Känguruh.

References

External links 

 The Boxing Kangaroo at Silent Era

1890s British films
British black-and-white films
British silent short films
Films directed by Birt Acres
1890s short documentary films
Black-and-white documentary films
British boxing films
Films about kangaroos and wallabies
1890s rediscovered films
British short documentary films
Rediscovered British films